Nicolas Gandiongco Escario (December 6, 1898 – November 1, 1958) was a Filipino Visayan physician, educator, and legislator from Cebu, Philippines. He served as Mayor of Cebu City, member of the Cebu provincial board, and member of the House of Representatives (1950–1957). In 1946, he founded Cebu Institute of Technology.

Early life 
Nicolas G. Escario was the son of Gregorio Escario and Victoria Gandiongco in Bantayan, Cebu on December 6, 1898. He studied at the Colegio de San Carlos (now University of San Carlos), acquired his bachelor's degree at Ateneo de Manila in 1918, and University of Santo Tomas where he graduated with a degree in medicine in 1923.

Personal life 
Married to Socorro Lizares who hailed from wealthy Negros-based family of sugar barons, he had three children: Gregorio, Nicolas Jr., and Maria Socorro.

Career 
From 1924 until 1928, he started his career practicing medicine at the Southern Islands Hospital as senior resident physician. Later, he was appointed physician of the Central Azucarera del Danao in Toboso, Negros Occidental.

Cebu Institute of Technology – University 
In 1946, together with United States-trained engineers Fidel C. Dagani, Amancio A. Alcordo, and Jose A. Cavan, he founded the Cebu Institute of Technology and became its first ever president. The school's goal was to make college education available to students from Visayas and Mindanao.

Cebu government 
In the aftermath of World War II in 1946, he became member of the Cebu provincial board. He would later become the mayor of Cebu City by the appointment of the Osmeña administration from 1945 until 1946. The biggest challenge of his term was to restore the city and the local government with diminished public funds. He spent his own personal money to pay for government employees. Vicente S. Del Rosario succeeded him on May 26, 1946.

Congress 
As a candidate for the Liberal Party, he was elected member of the 2nd Congress of the Republic in 1950, receiving the biggest majority votes among Liberal candidates. He was reelected for another term at the 3rd Congress of the Republic in November 10, 1953, serving Cebu's 7th district until 1957. He was a member of the Committee on Appropriations, Committee on Education, Committee on health, and Committee on War Veterans.

Historical commemoration 
The street previously known as Waling Waling was renamed Nicolas Escario Street in his honor. It is located along the Cebu Provincial Capitol and extends until the intersection of Jakosalem Extension and Gorordo Avenue.

Further reading 

 Tan, Santiago U. A Study of the Life of Dr. Nicolas G. Escario and His Contribution to Education, University of the Visayas (1969)

References 

1958 deaths
20th-century Filipino educators
20th-century Filipino medical doctors
University of San Carlos alumni
Ateneo de Manila University alumni
1898 births
Filipino city and municipal councilors
Members of the House of Representatives of the Philippines from Cebu
University of Santo Tomas alumni
Members of the Cebu Provincial Board